Richard Mann (born April 20, 1947) is an American football coach. He was the wide receivers coach of the Pittsburgh Steelers from 2013 to 2017. He also served as an assistant coach for the Baltimore Colts, Indianapolis Colts, Cleveland Browns, New York Jets, Baltimore Ravens, Kansas City Chiefs, Washington Redskins and Tampa Bay Buccaneers.

References

1947 births
Living people
Arizona State Sun Devils football players
Arizona State Sun Devils football coaches
Louisville Cardinals football coaches
Baltimore Colts coaches
Indianapolis Colts coaches
Cleveland Browns coaches
New York Jets coaches
Baltimore Ravens coaches
Kansas City Chiefs coaches
Washington Redskins coaches
Tampa Bay Buccaneers coaches
Pittsburgh Steelers coaches